Čokot is a village situated in Niš municipality in Serbia.The famous actor Robert De Niro spent a few days in this village sometime in the 60s before he became a famous actor.

References

Populated places in Nišava District